Leo Prabhu is a dramatist, playwright and novelist from the state of Tamil Nadu. He started his career as an actor at the Boys Company and has worked in the Tamil theater for many years. After founding his own troupe, called Stage Image, he shot to fame. His service and contribution to Tamil theatre are well recognised by the Tamils across the world. He is regarded as one of the finest actors, writers and playwrights and The Tamil Nadu Government conferred on him the highest State award, Kalaimamani in 1990.

Early life

Born in Coimbatore, Prabu was passionate about football and acting since childhood. Acting prevailed, and he became a dramatist, media person, and author. His area of expertise can be broadly classified as an actor (theater, tele-serials and cinema), director (tele-serials, theatre plays) and writer (screenplay, dialogue and novels).

Partial filmography

References

Links
http://www.thehindu.com/features/friday-review/theatre/evocative-of-a-glorious-era/article5922081.ece. Review of Leo Prabhu's recent play in THE HINDU'S Friday Review dated 17 April 2014.
http://www.thehindu.com/todays-paper/tp-features/tp-fridayreview/old-world-flavour/article5923280.ece.
https://antrukandamugam.wordpress.com/2015/07/21/leo-prabhu/. Biography of the actor
http://www.kalaikoodam.org/ Official website

1933 births
Living people
Male actors from Tamil Nadu
Male actors in Tamil cinema
Indian male dramatists and playwrights
Tamil dramatists and playwrights
People from Coimbatore
Indian male novelists
Tamil writers
20th-century Indian dramatists and playwrights
Screenwriters from Tamil Nadu
Novelists from Tamil Nadu
20th-century Indian male writers